The Cymbellales are a diatom order in the class Bacillariophyceae. They include the following families:
 Anomoeoneidaceae	
 Cymbellaceae	
 Gomphonemataceae
 Rhoicospheniaceae

References

External links

 
Diatom orders